Diwan is a 2003 Indian Tamil-language film starring Sarathkumar, Kiran Rathod, and Vadivelu. It was directed by Surya Prakash, who previously directed Maayi with Sarathkumar. S. A. Rajkumar composed the music. This film had an average run at the box office.

Plot
Raghavan (Sarathkumar) and Velu (Vadivelu) work as cooks in a non-veg hotel. Raghavan loves Geetha (Kiran Rathod) who is the daughter of a rich man (Vijayan), but her father is against this love and insults him as a poor man. Raghavan challenges that he will be rich in a year. There is a subplot in the story, for Meenakshi (Sharmili), a daughter from a rich family; she is the apple of the eye of the family. Meenakshi ran home with her lover Raju, who worked as a driver to her house. He tells that his friend Dinesh will help them. However, Raju escaped because he had a bad dream where he is killed by her family as if it will happen in reality. Due to that he vanishes. Raghavan understands her plight and helps her. Raghavan fights Dinesh and his men and escapes to Rajapalayam along with Meenakshi.

Suddenly he comes to a place where all call him "Duraisingam". Raghavan does not know who Duraisingam is. Manorama explains to him that Raghavan is the grandson of Duraisingam. The flashback is Duraisingam (Sarathkumar again) is a do-gooder who helps poor people, and he has a clash with Kandhavel (Jaya Prakash Reddy), a big rowdy. Duraisingam could not kill him because he promised to his wife that she will never become a widow. In the clash, Duraisingam's two sons are killed, and the baby (the son of Duraisingam's older son) is lost. The baby happens to be Raghavan. Duraisingam surrenders to the police. After the flashback, Raghavan visits the jail only to know that Duraisingam had died a few years back. Kandhavel becomes furious after getting to know that his son Dinesh succumbed to the injuries caused by Raghavan during the fight to safeguard Meenakshi. Kandhavel sends his henchmen to kill Raghavan and Meenakshi. During the car chase the car in which Raghavan and Meenakshi were in tumbles down near a riverbed. Miraculously, Raghavan and Meenakshi escapes from this accident and reach the defunct mill of Meenakshi's family.  Meenakshi's father and her relatives while attempting to kill each other receives a call from Raghavan. Raghavan acts like a kidnapper and demands ransom from Meenakshi's family. Eventually Meenakshi's father and the relatives find Raghavan and Meenakshi in their mill and bashes him, but apologizes to him after knowing the truth from Meenakshi. Kandhavel along with his men reach the mill and engage in a fight with Raghavan and Meenakshi's family. Raghavan fights them all but forgives Kandhavel and cautions that he should live as a reformed man. Meenakshi marries the groom selected by her parents, and Raghavan unites with Geetha.

Cast

Sarathkumar as Raghavan/Duraisingam
Kiran Rathod as Geetha
Vadivelu as Velu
Sharmilee as Meenakshi
Manorama as Duraisingam's sister
Sriman as Saravana Paandian (Duraisingam's son and Raghavan's father)
Jaya Prakash Reddy as Kandhavel
Anandaraj as Meenakshi's father
Uday Prakash as Chandran
Muthukaalai as Marudha Muthukaalai
Ponnambalam as Kandhavel's second brother
Madhan Bob
Bhupinder Singh
Crane Manohar
Manobala
Vijayan
Ravi Raghavendra
Ajay Rathnam
Thalapathy Dinesh
Thennavan
Halwa Vasu
Balu Anand
Besant Ravi as Kandhavel's younger brother
Suryakanth

Production
After directing Telugu film Bharatasimha Reddy with Rajasekhar, Surya Prakash announced his fourth directorial titled "Diwaan" with Sarathkumar collaborating with him for second time after Maayi.

Shooting for the film commenced at Chennai and neighbouring areas. In this film, the actor reportedly has  done yet another risky scene without the help of a double. He had to climb a high-rise building using a rope hanging from the roof. A stunt scene was shot on "grandpa" Sharat Kumar and about 20 stuntmen. A romantic scene and a song was picturised at the Besant Nagar Beach in Chennai, where Sharat and Kiran took part. A few songs were also shot at exotic locations in New Zealand.

Soundtrack

Reviews
The film received mixed reviews. Lollu express criticized the film comparing it to Lion King. Thiraipadam.com wrote:"Diwaan boasts of one of the most shoddy screenplays and atrocious editing in recent times. The movie has a lot of things going on, which is usually a good thing since it contributes to the pace of the movie. But the director fails to keep a rein on things and the movie soon spirals out of his control. There are just too many loose ends and unanswered questions".

References

2003 films
2000s Tamil-language films
Indian action drama films
2000s action drama films